Pilot Butte, meaning "lookout point", is a town in southeast Saskatchewan. Situated between Highway 46 and the Trans-Canada Highway, the town is part of the White Butte region and neighbours Balgonie, White City, and the province's capital city, Regina. As of the 2021 Canadian census, Pilot Butte had a population of 2,638, an 23% growth from 2016. The town is governed by the Pilot Butte Town Council and is surrounded by the Rural Municipality of Edenwold No. 158. Pilot Butte is located in Treaty 4 territory.

Prior to European arrival, local Indigenous peoples camped near Boggy Creek and used the butte as a lookout point. European settlement began in the area in the 1840s, and Pilot Butte was established in 1882. Pilot Butte's early development was more substantial than neighbouring settlements thanks to its brick plants, sand and gravel deposits, and location on the Canadian Pacific Railway mainline. The community incorporated as a village in the early 20th century; however, following World War I, most of its residents and buildings, including a hotel, train station, and water tower, were dismantled or destroyed.

The completion of the Trans-Canada Highway in the 1950s brought people back out to Pilot Butte. It reincorporated as a village and then gained town status in 1979. A year later, the name "Sand Capital of Canada" was chosen in a town slogan contest, and in 1982, Pilot Butte celebrated its 100th anniversary and a monument was erected atop Butte Hill. In 1995, the Pilot Butte Storm damaged most of the buildings and nearly every tree town.

Since the storm, the town has continued to grow. Pilot Butte hosted the Western Canadian Softball Championships in 2002 and an annual rodeo has attracted visitors to the town every summer since 1993. The 2010s saw the beginning of new housing and commercial developments in town, as well as various infrastructure updates, which have continued to attract new residents. Between 2016 and 2021, Pilot Butte was the fastest growing population centre in Saskatchewan.

History

Indigenous peoples and Treaty 4
The butte played a significant role in the lives of the local Indigenous peoples, who camped near Boggy Creek and used the butte as a lookout and signal point. The Cree call the hill Otasawâpiwin, meaning "his lookout." Indigenous peoples of the present-day Pilot Butte area include the Assiniboine (Nakoda) and Cree (Nehiyawak) people; the area is also the homeland of the Métis. Beginning in 1874 at Fort Qu'Appelle, Treaty 4 was signed between the Queen Victoria and various First Nation band governments, with its coverage spanning the Pilot Butte area.

Settlement and founding

European settlement in the area can be traced back to the 1840s, with the Dominion Lands Act of 1872 encouraging homesteaders to come to the area where they could purchase  of land for $10.<ref name=":22">{{Cite book|title=Pilot Butte & District: Celebrating 125 Years of Living, 1882-2007.|year=2007|isbn=978-1-897010-41-9|location=Regina, Saskatchewan}}</ref> By 1882, the Canadian Pacific Railway had made its way through the District of Assiniboia; between Pilot Butte and Regina a crew set a company record for the most track laid in a single day.

With the construction of the railway through the region, the community was established and the area's sand and gravel deposits were extensively utilized. In the following years, as settlers began farming in the district, Pilot Butte developed, with the name being chosen in 1883 to mean "lookout point". The origin of the name is derived from the flat-topped hill located in the community that served as a lookout for hunting buffalo. Speakers of Cree called the hill and the community Otasawâpiwin (ᐅᑕᓴᐚᐱᐏᐣ), meaning "his lookout." Early homes in the community were built on the south side of the track using bricks from the local red brick plant, which began production in 1890. In 1891, Pilot Butte School District No. 207 was established; the school was located south of the community.

Because of Pilot Butte's location on the Canadian Pacific Railway mainline, significant settlement took place between 1880 and 1900, and a second brick plant began production in 1900. The community's sand and gravel deposits were used during the construction of the railway and for the local brick plants. British and German immigration to Pilot Butte was common throughout its early decades, while Ukrainian immigration would begin in 1902.

Heyday and decline

The settlement had grown greatly since its founding; a post office opened in October 1903, and in 1913 Pilot Butte was incorporated as a village. At one point, the village offered the Canadian Pacific Railway a reliable year round water source so a water conduit was built to Regina. During its peak, the village boasted a railway station, three grain elevators, a stockyard, the Kitchener Hotel, boarding houses, a pool hall, bowling alley, general store, butcher and blacksmith shops, two churches, and two section houses. In 1913, a two-storey, red brick school was built in town, which also served as a community centre.

The community's brickyards were major local employers (employing over 800 people at one point); however, they closed during World War I. During the war in 1915, there were unsuccessfully attempts to drill for oil. With automobiles allowing for easy transport to Regina, Pilot Butte began to lose its population—a trend that would continue for years. In 1923, the village was dissolved because of the loss in population. During the Great Depression and leading up to World War II, Pilot Butte had lost most of the residents and services that it once had. In 1926, the CHWC radio station began broadcasting from the Kitchener Hotel, but the broadcasting ended in 1936 when the hotel eventually closed.

Today, the old Pilot Butte schoolhouse is located to the north of the town on private property, and the Arrat schoolhouse is located directly south of St. George's cemetery. Except for the schoolhouses and the Marin House, a house on Railway Avenue built of brick from the red brick plant, there are few physical reminders of the town's early development; most original structures, such as the hotel, train station, and water tower, have all been dismantled or destroyed.

Post-war regrowth
In 1946, the Pilot Butte Memorial Hall was opened; Premier Tommy Douglas was in attendance and spoke at the ceremony. The Trans-Canada Highway was completed through Saskatchewan in 1957; similarly to the building of the railway, the new highway attracted new residents to move to Pilot Butte, as the village became a popular option for those wanting to live in a town but commute to the city. Because of the growing population, the brick school was replaced by a larger, stucco school in 1958. In 1963 the town re-acquired village status, and in the following years, the town saw infrastructure updates and a continued population growth. In 1964, street lights were installed in the village; in 1968, the village saw the introduction of street signs and its first zoning bylaw; and in 1976, construction began on the Pilot Butte rink and recreation complex. Towards the end of the decade, the water tower was destroyed and construction began on a village office on Railway Avenue.

By 1979, the community acquired town status. A year later, the name "Sand Capital of Canada" was chosen in a town slogan contest, and in 1981, the Royal Canadian Mounted Police began providing police services to the town. In 1982, Pilot Butte celebrated its 100th anniversary and a monument was erected atop Butte Hill. The same year, construction began on a new fire hall on Railway Avenue, and Highway 46 was paved in 1984. In 1985, a library was opened in town, and in 1988, Pilot Butte School received a large expansion and renovation which included more classrooms, a science lab, home economics lab, stage, art room, and gymnasium. This same year, Ed Zsombor was elected mayor and would continue to hold this office until 2009. 1993 marked the first annual Pilot Butte Rodeo.

Storm of 1995 and recent history
A violent storm known as the Pilot Butte storm of 1995 hit the area on 26 August 1995, damaging most homes in the community. In the following years, trees were replanted throughout town and homes were repaired. In 2001, Pilot Butte's Prairie Junior Hockey League team was renamed from the Express to the Storm to remember the event, and in 2020, residents of the town observed a 25-year-anniversary of the event.

Since the storm, the town has continued to grow and is home to a post office, school, church, library, gas station, and various restaurants and manufacturing plants. Recreational facilities in town include an indoor and outdoor rink, four ball diamonds, a splash park, and various other parks. In 2001, the Regina Express junior hockey team were relocated to Pilot Butte; the team would be renamed to the Pilot Butte Storm in 2003 (after the 1995 storm) and go on to win the PJHL title four times and win bronze at the Keystone Cup in 2011.

In 2002, Pilot Butte hosted the Western Canadian Softball Championships, and in 2007, the town celebrated its 125th anniversary with a slow-pitch tournament, powwow, the introduction of a town flag, and the writing of a town history book. The community's annual rodeo has attracted visitors to the town every summer since 1993. The 2010s saw the beginning of new housing and commercial developments in town during the mayorship of Nat Ross. Construction was completed on a new water treatment and sewer disposal facility in 2014, and the town received federal and provincial funding for wastewater treatment upgrades in 2017. In 2018, a diverging diamond interchange opened on the Pilot Butte access road as part of the Regina Bypass project, only the second of its kind in Canada.

From 2016 to 2021, Pilot Butte was the fastest growing population centre in Saskatchewan, recording a 23.4% increase in population at the 2021 census.

Geography
The town is situated on a broad, flat, treeless and largely waterless plain. The Butte Hill, the hill which the town is named after, is the highest point in the area. Like in Regina, all of the town's trees, shrubs, and other plants were hand-planted, and because of the Pilot Butte storm, which destroyed most trees in the town, many have been re-planted since 1995.

Climate
Pilot Butte experiences a dry humid continental climate (Köppen: Dfb) in the NRC Plant Hardiness Zone 3b. Pilot Butte has warm summers and cold, dry winters, prone to extremes at all times of the year. Precipitation is heaviest from June through August in the form of rain, while snow is common in the winter.

 Culture 
The town hosts the Annual Pilot Butte outdoor rodeo on the third weekend of June every year since 1993, complete with cabaret featuring current country headline musicians. Pilot Butte also has the Golden Sunset Recreational Club (55+ Club), the Pilot Butte Beavers/Cubs/Scouts, a library, the Pilot Butte Photo Bunch and the Pilot Butte Riding Club.

 Parks and attractions 
Pilot Butte features multiple parks, most notably Inland Park, which is home to the Butte Hill, the municipal office, four baseball diamonds, the indoor and outdoor rinks, public library, two play structures, a splash park, and a skate park. As well, the Discovery Ridge housing development is home to a small lake, a soccer field, and biking and walking paths. Nearby White Butte Trails Provincial Recreation Site is home to trails for cross-country skiing in the winter and biking and running in the summer. Nearby golf courses include, Westfalia, Green Acres, Murray, and Tor Hill. Since 2020, Pilot Butte has been home to a drive-in movie theatre, which is located directly north of town on the rodeo grounds and is only one of few in the province.

 Sports 
The Pilot Butte Storm, 4-time winners of the Prairie Junior Hockey League, have been located in Pilot Butte since 1995 and are named after the Pilot Butte Storm of 1995 (they were originally called the Pilot Butte Express until 2001).

Demographics

Pilot Butte is part of the Regina census metropolitan area (CMA), which in the 2021 census had a population of 249,217, a change of 5.3% from its 2016 population of 236,695.

The 2021 census reported that immigrants (individuals born outside Canada) comprise 80 persons or 3.0% of the total population of Pilot Butte. The median age is 36.8 years old, which is lower than the median age of Canada at 41.8 years old. The largest religious groups were Christianity (1,450 or 55.1%) and Irreligion (1,175 or 44.7%).

Nearly all Pilot Butte residents know English (2,625 or 99.8%), while other languages known by residents include French, Tagalog, Russian, German, and Ukrainian.

 Ethnicity and visible minorities 
The most commonly identified ethnic or cultural origins in Pilot Butte in the 2021 census were German (915 or 34.8%), English (715 or 27.2%), Scottish (505 or 19.2%), Irish (455 or 17.3%), and Ukrainian (420 or 16.0%). In the 2016 census, 2.7% of Pilot Butte residents identified as a visible minority and 2.3% as Aboriginal.

Government

Pilot Butte was initially incorporated as a village in 1913, but subsequently dissolved in 1923 due to population loss. In 1963, the community reincorporated as a village, and in 1979 it gained town status for the first time. While the village council began in 1963, the first person to be elected to the position of mayor of the town council was John Dueck in 1980. Today, Pilot Butte is governed by a council that consists of one elected mayor and six elected councillors as well as a town administrator.

 Media 
The Town of Pilot Butte has distributed the News and Views newsletter since October 1987.

Notable people
Notable people that were born in or lived in Pilot Butte include:

 Clayton Gerein, wheelchair athlete and seven-time Paralympian; lived in Pilot Butte
 Reuben Ross, diver and two-time Olympian; grew up in Pilot Butte
 Myroslaw Stechishin, socialist activist and Ukrainian-Canadian public figure; lived in Pilot Butte

 Further reading 
Stechishin, Myroslaw (1904). "Pilot Butte."
Town of Pilot Butte 125th Celebration Committee (2007). Pilot Butte & District: Celebrating 125 Years of Living, 1882-2007''.

Notes

References

External links

 
Edenwold No. 158, Saskatchewan
Towns in Saskatchewan
Division No. 6, Saskatchewan